Douglas Geoffrey Rowell (13 February 1943 – 11 June 2017) was an Anglican bishop, who served as Bishop of Basingstoke and then as the third Bishop in Europe until his retirement on 8 November 2013. Following his retirement he ministered as an assistant bishop in the Diocese of Chichester (from 2013) and in the Diocese of Portsmouth (from 2015). He died in the early morning of Trinity Sunday, 11 June 2017.

Education
Rowell was educated at Winchester College and Corpus Christi College, Cambridge. He received the degrees of Bachelor of Arts (1964), Master of Arts (1968), and Doctor of Philosophy (1968) from Cambridge University and was incorporated MA and DPhil at Oxford University. In 1997 he was awarded the degree of Doctor of Divinity (DD) from Oxford.

Career
Rowell never worked in parochial ministry. After ordination he worked as a lecturer in the University of Oxford and assistant chaplain of New College (1968–1972) and then chaplain of Keble College (1972–1994), until his ordination to the episcopate as Bishop of Basingstoke.

From 1999, Rowell was an episcopal patron of Project Canterbury, an online archive of Anglican texts.

Rowell was consecrated as a bishop by George Carey, Archbishop of Canterbury, on 2 February 1994 at St Paul's Cathedral, becoming Bishop of Basingstoke, a suffragan bishopric in the Diocese of Winchester.

Rowell was commissioned as Bishop of Gibraltar in Europe (often called "Bishop in Europe") on 18 October 2001 at St Margaret's, Westminster, and enthroned at the Cathedral of the Holy Trinity, Gibraltar, on 1 November 2001.

Views
At the November 2012 meeting of the General Synod of the Church of England, Rowell was one of the three members of the House of Bishops who voted against the ordination of women as bishops.

Rowell was part of the traditionalist Anglo-Catholic wing of the Church of England.

Turkish controversies
In 2004, Rowell disagreed publicly with parishioners in Turkey over his plans to lease a historic and recently renovated church building for use as a nightclub. The plan was defeated after popular complaints.

In January 2007, Rowell suspended the chaplain of Istanbul, Ian Sherwood, and the entire chaplaincy council. By 2008 the disagreement between Rowell and the Anglican chaplaincies in Turkey had intensified, as the bishop insisted on ordaining a Turkish convert from Islam despite complaints from local Anglican clergy and laity that the ordination would place them in serious physical danger. When the bishop arrived to carry out the ordination he found himself locked out of all six Anglican churches and was forced to administer the ordination in a borrowed Calvinist chapel. The secretary of the Istanbul chaplaincy council described Rowell as a "rogue bishop", whilst the senior chaplain in Turkey accused Rowell of causing suffering to ordinary people because the bishop's life had been largely "in the shelter of Oxford University".

Outline of career
Ordained priest in the Church of England, 1969
Chaplain of Keble College, Oxford, 1971–1994
Examining Chaplain to the Bishop of Leicester, 1979–1990
Canon of Chichester Cathedral, 1981–2001
Examining Chaplain to the Bishop of Winchester, 1991–1993
Suffragan Bishop of Basingstoke, 1994–2001 
Bishop in Europe, 2001–2013

Styles
The Reverend Geoffrey Rowell (1968–1981)
The Reverend Canon Geoffrey Rowell (1981–1994)
The Right Reverend Geoffrey Rowell (1994–2017)

Writings
Rowell was extensively published in the field of Anglo-Catholic church history. He was the founding president of the Anglo Catholic History Society. He authored or co-authored the following:
 

Rowell co-authored and edited these anthologies:

See also
Order of St. David of Wales, St. Alban and St. Crescentino

References

External links

 Anglicans in Istanbul, Letter to "the Times", 2 February 2007

1943 births
2017 deaths
Alumni of Corpus Christi College, Cambridge
Bishops of Basingstoke
21st-century Anglican bishops of Gibraltar
Fellows of Keble College, Oxford
People educated at Winchester College
Place of birth missing
Anglo-Catholic bishops
20th-century Church of England bishops